is a Japanese voice actress associated with Yūrin Pro. She is best known for voicing Ako Saotome in Aikatsu Stars! and Ai Miyashita in Love Live! School Idol Festival All Stars for the Nijigasaki High School Idol Club.

Biography
Natsumi Murakami was born in Tokyo on 7 September 1995. Her motivation to become a voice actor came from a reading drama where a junior high school English class spoke to an Alice in Wonderland book; her classmates gave her the impression that Alice's voice was cute, and she became interested in the voice acting profession. The perspective of the anime that she liked originally changed, and she was impressed by Miyano Mamoru's performance in Death Note.

As a junior high school student, she could not work part-time and did not have the money to attend lessons, so she concentrated on schoolwork. After completing exams, Murakami started looking for a school she could study voice acting. Murakami attended hands-on classes at several vocational schools and training schools, and seeing good tension in it, decided to enroll in Keiko Yokozawa's school, where she started learning the basics of voice acting.

Her debut anime was in Aikatsu Stars!, where she voiced Ako Saotome. She mentions Ako Saotome as a turning point in her voice acting career, and says that she is important in her life. In addition to Saotome, she also cites Wobblinger-Milli, a character she voiced in the video game Quiz RPG: The World of Mystic Wiz, as leaving a lasting impression on her.

She voiced Ai Miyashita in Love Live! School Idol Festival All Stars for the Nijigasaki High School Idol Club. She reprised the role for the project's anime adaptation, which premiered in 2020.

Personal life
She has level 2 Kanji Kentei certification.

She described her goal as to play an orthodox heroine in a romantic comedy. She cites Ikue Ōtani and Rie Kugimiya as her admirations.

Her favorite foods are meat and white rice and Japanese curry. Her favorite anime is Cardcaptor Sakura, which she has been repeatedly watching since kindergarten, and her favorite musician is aiko. She has a pet dog named .

After she started fishing, which is one of her hobbies, she began to like it because she caught a lot of fish.

On June 30, 2022, Murakami tested positive for COVID-19.

Filmography

Anime
2016
Aikatsu Stars! as Ako Saotome
2017
Minami Kamakura High School Girls Cycling Club as Megumi Mizuno
Urara Meirocho
2019
Aikatsu on Parade! as Ako Saotome
Fight League: Gear Gadget Generators as Autocleaner Machi
2020
Mewkledreamy as Yume Hinata
Love Live! Nijigasaki High School Idol Club as Ai Miyashita
2021
Combatants Will Be Dispatched! as Rose
2022
Slow Loop as Futaba Fukumoto
Love Live! Nijigasaki High School Idol Club 2nd Season as Ai Miyashita
The Little Lies We All Tell as Chiyo

Film
2016
Aikatsu Stars! the Movie as Ako Saotome

Video games
2017
Quiz RPG: The World of Mystic Wiz as Wobblinger-Milli
2019
Love Live! School Idol Festival All Stars as Ai Miyashita
2020
100% Orange Juice as Ceoreparque (Witch Pack DLC)
2022
Dreamin' Her -Boku wa, Kanojo no Yume o Miru.- as  Kako, Mirai Nanase

References

External links
 
 

1995 births
Living people
Japanese voice actresses
Japanese video game actresses
Nijigasaki High School Idol Club members
Voice actresses from Tokyo
21st-century Japanese actresses
21st-century Japanese singers
21st-century Japanese women singers